A Place in the Country consists of six essays or monographs by W.G. Sebald, each devoted to a specific writer or artist.

Contents

A Comet in the Heavens: On Johann Peter Hebel
J'Aurais Voulu Que Ce Lac Eut Été L'océan: On Jean Jacques-Rousseau
Why I Grieve I Do Not Know: On Eduard Morike
Death Draws Nigh, Time Marches On: On Gottfried Keller
Le Promeneur Solitaire: On Robert Walser
As Day and Night: On Jan Peter Tripp

References

Further reading

German essay collections
20th-century German literature
Works by W. G. Sebald
1998 non-fiction books
Suffolk